Kaysie Brooke Clark (born January 31, 1993) is an American former soccer player who played for FC Kansas City in the National Women's Soccer League.

Club career
After playing collegiately for the University of Missouri, Clark was draft by FC Kansas City with the 35th pick in the 2015 NWSL College Draft. She made one appearance for FCKC in 2015, as the team went on to win the 2015 NWSL Championship. Clark did not join the team for the 2016 season, as she chose to pursue other opportunities.

Honors 
FC Kansas City
Winner
 National Women's Soccer League: 2015

References

External links 
 

1993 births
Living people
American women's soccer players
National Women's Soccer League players
FC Kansas City players
Women's association football midfielders
Missouri Tigers women's soccer players
FC Kansas City draft picks
Soccer players from Missouri
People from Liberty, Missouri